Michael Brinegar (born September 15, 1999) is an American swimmer  specializing in distance freestyle and open water swimming.

He participated at the 2019 World Aquatics Championships, winning a medal.

Career

College
Brinegar attends Indiana University Bloomington, where he competes for the Indiana Hoosiers swimming and diving team. After the close of his freshman year in the spring of 2019 he chose to redshirt the following year and elected to train in California with the Mission Viejo Nadadores. He returned to Bloomington for his sophomore year fall 2020.

At the NCAA Men's Division I Swimming and Diving Championships during his freshman year, he placed second at the NCAA Championship in the 1,650 yard freestyle (14:27.50).

2020 Olympic Trials

In 2021, Brinegar placed second in the 800m freestyle at the 2020 US Olympic Team Trials, qualifying him for the Olympic Games in Tokyo.

References

External links
 
 

1999 births
Living people
American male freestyle swimmers
World Aquatics Championships medalists in open water swimming
Swimmers at the 2020 Summer Olympics
Sportspeople from Indiana
People from Columbus, Indiana
Indiana Hoosiers men's swimmers
20th-century American people
21st-century American people